Chetan Anand Buradagunta (born 8 July 1980) is a badminton player from India. Anand is a four-time national champion in 2004, 2007, 2008 and 2010, and three-time South Asian Games men's singles champion in 2004, 2006 and 2010. He has a career best world ranking of world no 10. His ranking has dropped to 54 since October 2010 due to his ankle injury. He is a recipient of the Indian Arjuna Award in 2006.

Badminton career 
Anand started his badminton career in 1992 at the Mini Nationals in Mumbai. He was successful in doubles in his early badminton career, pairing with A. Prithvi, winning 12 year and 15 years age groups. He reached his first open nationals singles final in Kerala at age fifteen, but failed to win the title and was runner-up though he won the doubles pairing with A. Prithvi. Later, Prakash Padukone sent him to the World Academy camp in Kuala Lumpur, Malaysia, where he made significant improvements to his game. Anand won the first singles title of his career at Chennai in a Junior major ranking tournament. The same year he made his mark in the senior category as well, reaching the semi-finals in all of the senior ranking tournaments, and reaching the top eight in the country. He became the Junior National Champion in 1999. In 2001, he won his first Asian Satellite tournament in Bangalore which marked his beginning in seniors. Later he won more than 15 major ranking tournaments in India.

Anand became the national badminton champion for first time in 2004 after faltering in the finals in 2002 and 2003 to Abhinn Shyam Gupta. He also won the Toulouse Open in France in 2004, recovering from a back injury during the summer 2004. In 2005 he won Irish and Scottish open badminton tournaments in Ireland and Scotland. In 2008 he won his first Grand Prix title at the Bitburger Open. He was also the Runner-up in Dutch Grand Prix in 2008 and followed them with a couple of quarterfinal appearances. He touched his career best world ranking 10 in 2009 February. In 2009, he won the Dutch Open Grand Prix which he lost in the finals in 2008. He also won the Jaypee Syed Modi Memorial Grand Prix at Lucknow in December 2009.

Early life 
Anand was born to Harshavardhan and Suguna in Vijayawada, India and has a younger brother Sandeep Anand. Anand's father Harshavardhan had formerly been an annual participant in the Inter-state Lecturer's Tournaments. Anand also took a personal interest in badminton, and he started playing with his father. He did his schooling at Veeramachineni Paddayya Siddhartha public school and bachelors in engineering in Mechanical Manufacturing from the Potluri V Prasad Siddhartha Institute of Technology in Vijayawada.

Personal life
On 17 July 2005, Anand married fellow badminton player Jwala Gutta. They got divorced in 2010. Chetan married Sarada Govardhini Jasti in October 2012 and has two daughters.

Career
Anand is employed by the Oil and Natural Gas Corporation in India. He was signed as the first Brand Ambassador for promoting Li Ning Sporting goods in India in 2009.He also has a badminton academy in Hyderabad(CABA).

Achievements

Commonwealth Games

South Asian Games

BWF Grand Prix 
The BWF Grand Prix has two levels, the BWF Grand Prix and Grand Prix Gold. It is a series of badminton tournaments sanctioned by the Badminton World Federation (BWF) since 2007. The World Badminton Grand Prix sanctioned by International Badminton Federation (IBF) since 1983. 

 BWF Grand Prix Gold tournament
 BWF & IBF Grand Prix tournament

IBF/BWF International 
 

  BWF International Challenge tournament
  BWF International Series tournament
  BWF Future Series tournament

Record against selected opponents 
Results are from all international competitions since Chetan Anand made his debut in 2003. The athletes listed are athletes who regularly competed at badminton's major competitions, including those who he faced at the World Championship and Olympic competition.

  Bao Chunlai 0–1
  Chen Hong 0–1
  Chen Jin 0–2
  Du Pengyu 0–1
  Peter Gade 0–2
  Kenneth Jonassen 0–4
  Jan Ø. Jørgensen 1–0
  Joachim Persson 0–3
  Hans-Kristian Vittinghus 3–0
  Carl Baxter 2–0
  Aamir Ghaffar 3–2
  Rajiv Ouseph 3–0
  Andrew Smith 1–3
  Marc Zwiebler 1–1
  Chan Yan Kit 2–0
  Ng Wei 0–1
  Arvind Bhat 1–2
  Anup Sridhar 2–0
  Sony Dwi Kuncoro 1–3
  Simon Santoso 0–1
  Sho Sasaki 3–1
  Shoji Sato 1–1
  Kenichi Tago 0–3
  Lee Chong Wei 0–3
  Dicky Palyama 2–1
  Eric Pang 3–0
  Przemyslaw Wacha 2–1
  Kendrick Lee Yen Hui 0–1
  Lee Hyun-il 0–2
  Boonsak Ponsana 0–1
  Tanongsak Saensomboonsuk 1–1
  Nguyen Tien Minh 0–2

References

External links 

 
 Results at the Commonwealth Games 2006

1980 births
Living people
People from Krishna district
Racket sportspeople from Vijayawada
Indian male badminton players
Indian national badminton champions
Badminton players at the 2006 Asian Games
Badminton players at the 2010 Asian Games
Asian Games competitors for India
Badminton players at the 2006 Commonwealth Games
Badminton players at the 2010 Commonwealth Games
Commonwealth Games silver medallists for India
Commonwealth Games bronze medallists for India
Commonwealth Games medallists in badminton
South Asian Games gold medalists for India
South Asian Games silver medalists for India
Recipients of the Arjuna Award
South Asian Games medalists in badminton
Medallists at the 2006 Commonwealth Games
Medallists at the 2010 Commonwealth Games